Nowy Dwor Gdanski (formerly ) is a town in Poland on the Tuja river in the Żuławy Wiślane region, capital of Nowy Dwór Gdański County, located in Pomeranian Voivodeship, with 10,171 inhabitants (2012).

History

The settlement was established in 1570. Initially owned by the Loitz family, it was later governed by the Wejher and Sobieski noble families, including King of Poland John III Sobieski. Administratively it was part of the Malbork Voivodeship within the Polish Crown. As a result of the First Partition of Poland in 1772 it was annexed by the German state of Prussia. In 1920 it became part of the Free City of Danzig (Gdańsk).

On September 1, 1939, the day Germany invaded Poland, causing World War II, the Germans murdered the local Polish customs inspector. The town was then annexed by Nazi Germany. During the war, a subcamp of the Stutthof concentration camp was operated by the Germans in the town. One of the places where the Germans used the forced labour of Stutthof prisoners was the train station, where there is now a memorial plaque. After the defeat of Nazi Germany in the war in 1945, the town again became part of Poland.

Notable residents
 Krzysztof Pilarz (born 1980), professional goalkeeper, (praticipated in over 250 games)
 Piotr Sierzputowski (born 1992), tennis coach

International relations

Nowy Dwór Gdański is twinned with:

References

External links

Official webpage

Cities and towns in Pomeranian Voivodeship
Nowy Dwór Gdański County
1570 establishments in the Polish–Lithuanian Commonwealth
Populated places established in 1570